Qirnada or Ghirnada is a town in the District of Jabal al Akhdar in north-eastern Libya. It is located 20 km south of Bayda.

During Italian colonization it was named Battisti. after the Italian patriot and Irredentism martyr Cesare Battisti and was designed by Italian architect Florestano Di Fausto.

References

Populated places in Jabal al Akhdar